Viola Grahl (born 29 March 1966) is a German former field hockey player who competed in the 1988 Summer Olympics.

References

External links
 

1966 births
Living people
German female field hockey players
Olympic field hockey players of West Germany
Field hockey players at the 1988 Summer Olympics
Field hockey players from Berlin